Dimitrios Dimitriou (born 31 July 1997) is a Greek swimmer. He competed in the men's 400 metre freestyle event at the 2016 Summer Olympics. He finished 41st in the heats with a time of 3:54.98 and did not qualify for the final.

References

External links
 

1997 births
Living people
Greek male swimmers
Olympic swimmers of Greece
Swimmers at the 2015 European Games
European Games medalists in swimming
European Games silver medalists for Greece
Swimmers at the 2016 Summer Olympics
Place of birth missing (living people)
Swimmers at the 2018 Mediterranean Games
Mediterranean Games competitors for Greece